Mary, the mother of Jesus in Christianity, is known by many different titles (Blessed Mother, Virgin Mary, Mother of God, Our Lady, Holy Virgin), epithets (Star of the Sea, Queen of Heaven, Cause of Our Joy), invocations (Panagia, Mother of Mercy, God-bearer Theotokos), and several names associated with places (Our Lady of Loreto, Our Lady of Fátima).

All of these descriptives refer to the same woman named Mary, the mother of Jesus Christ (in the New Testament). They are used differently by Roman Catholics, Eastern Orthodox, Oriental Orthodox, and some Anglicans. (Note: Mary Magdalene, Mary of Clopas, and Mary Salome are different women.)

Some descriptives of Mary are properly titles, dogmatic in nature, while some are invocations. Other descriptives are poetic or allegorical or have lesser or no canonical status, but form part of popular piety, with varying degrees of acceptance by Church authorities. Another class of titles refer to depictions of Mary in Catholic Marian art and in art generally. A rich range of Marian titles also are used in musical settings of pieces dedicated to her.

Historical and cultural context

The relatively large number of titles given to Mary may be explained in several ways. Some titles grew due to geographic and cultural reasons, e.g., through the veneration of specific icons. Others were related to Marian apparitions.

Mary's intercession is sought for a large spectrum of human needs in varied situations. This has led to the formulation of many of her titles (good counsel, Help of the Sick, etc.). Moreover, meditations and devotions on the different aspects of Mary's role in the life of Jesus have led to additional titles, such as Our Lady of Sorrows. Still further titles have been derived from dogmas and doctrines, such as, the Assumption of Mary, Dormition of the Mother of God and Immaculate Conception.

The veneration of Mary was consolidated in the year 431 when, at the Council of Ephesus, the descriptive, Theotokos, or Mary the bearer (or mother) of God, was declared a dogma. Thereafter Marian devotion, centred on the subtle and complex relationship between Mary, Jesus, and the Church, began to flourish, first in the East and later in the West.

The Reformation diminished Mary's role in many parts of Europe in the 16th and 17th centuries. The Council of Trent and Counter Reformation intensified Marian devotion among Roman Catholics. Around the same period, Mary became an instrument of evangelisation in the Americas and parts of Asia and Africa, e.g. gaining impetus from reported apparitions at Our Lady of Guadalupe, which resulted in a large number of conversions to Christianity in Mexico.

Following the Reformation, baroque literature on Mary experienced unprecedented growth, with over 500 instances of Mariological writings during the 17th century alone. During the Age of Enlightenment, the emphasis on scientific progress and rationalism put Catholic theology and Mariology often on the defensive later in the 18th century. Books, such as The Glories of Mary by Alphonsus Liguori, were written in defence of the cult of Mary.

Dogmatic titles

 Mother of God: The Council of Ephesus decreed in 431 that Mary is Theotokos ("God-bearer") because her son Jesus is both God and man: one Divine Person with two natures (divine and human). This name was translated in the West as "Mater Dei" or Mother of God. From this derives the title "Blessed Mother".
 Virgin Mary: The doctrine of the perpetual virginity of Mary developed early in Christianity and was taught by the early Fathers, such as, Irenaeus and Clement of Alexandria (and others). In the fourth century "ever-virgin" became a popular title for Mary. Variations on this include the "Virgin Mary", the "Blessed Virgin", the "Blessed Virgin Mary", and "Spouse of the Holy Spirit". The perpetual virginity of Mary was declared a dogma by the Lateran Council of 649.
 Immaculate Conception: The dogma that Mary was conceived without original sin was defined in 1854, by Pope Pius IX's apostolic constitution Ineffabilis Deus. This gave rise to the titles of "Our Lady of the Immaculate Conception" and "Queen Conceived Without Original Sin". The Immaculate Conception is also honored under the titles of Our Lady of Lourdes, Our Lady of Caysasay (Philippines), Our Lady of the Gate of Dawn in Vilnius, Our Lady of Guidance, and Our Lady of Salambao, also in the Philippines.
Assumption: The belief that the Virgin Mary was assumed body and soul into heaven upon completing the course of her earthly life was declared a dogma in 1950 by Pope Pius XII in the apostolic constitution Munificentissimus Deus. The titles "Our Lady of Assumption" and "Queen Assumed Into Heaven" derive from this. This dogma is also reflected in devotion to Our Lady of Ta' Pinu on Malta.

In the Orthodox and Eastern Catholic Churches the Assumption of Mary may be translated as the Dormition of the Mother of God; it is an important feast day, not based on a scriptural canon but affirmed by tradition.

Early titles of Mary

"Our Lady" is a common title to give to Mary as a sign of respect and honor. In French she is called "Notre Dame" and in Spanish she is "Nuestra Señora".

 Mary was identified as the "New Eve" at least as early as the later half of the Second Century. Justin Martyr (100–165) draws the connection in his Dialogue with Trypho. This idea is later expanded by Irenaeus.
 John Chrysostom, in 345, was the first person to use the Marian title Mary Help of Christians as a devotion to the Virgin Mary. Don Bosco promoted devotion to Mary under this title.
 Stella Maris or Our Lady, Star of the Sea is an ancient title for the Virgin Mary, used to emphasize her role as a sign of hope and a guiding star for Christians. It is attributed to Jerome and cited by Paschasius Radbertus.

Papal actions

 After the Battle of Lepanto in 1571, Pope Pius V instituted the feast of the Blessed Virgin Mother of Victory.
 The first Marian image pontifically crowned was Lippo Memmi’s  painting of La Madonna della Febbre (Madonna of Fever) in the sacristy of Saint Peter's Basilica in Rome on 27 May 1631, by Pope Urban VIII by the Vatican Chapter.
 The doctrine of the Immaculate Conception of Mary was adopted as church dogma when Pope Pius IX promulgated Ineffabilis Deus in 1854.
 The encyclical Ad diem illum of Pope Pius X commemorated the fiftieth anniversary of the dogma of Immaculate Conception 
 During World War I, Pope Benedict XV added the invocation Mary Queen of Peace to the Litany of Loreto.
 Pope Pius XII issued the Apostolic constitution  Munificentissimus Deus to define ex cathedra the dogma of the Assumption of the Blessed Virgin Mary.
 In 1954, the papal encyclical Ad Caeli Reginam, issued by Pope Pius XII, explained how Mary is Queen of Heaven
 In 1960, Pope John XXIII changed the title of the "Feast of the Holy Rosary" (formerly the "Feast of Our Lady of Victory") to the "Feast of Our Lady of the Rosary."
 Pope John Paul II's 1987 encyclical Redemptoris Mater took the step of addressing the role of the Virgin Mary as Mediatrix.
 Several Papal actions over the centuries decreed the appellation "Queen of Poland" for Mary, following the solemn vows of King John Casimir Vasa before the papal legate and assembled episcopate, proclaiming Mary "Queen" of all his lands, at Lwów Cathedral on 1 April 1656. The last act was of John Paul II on 1 April 2005, on the eve of his death. The feast of The Most Holy Virgin Mary, Queen of Poland is on 3 May.

Descriptive titles of Mary related to visual arts

Devotional titles 

In the Loreto Litanies Mary's prayers are invoked under more than fifty separate titles, such as "Mother Most Pure", "Virgin Most Prudent", and "Cause of Our Joy".

Other devotional titles include:

Ark of the Covenant
Comfort (or Help) of the Afflicted
Our Lady, Gate of the Dawn
Holy Mary
Immaculate Heart of Mary
Mother of Christ
Mother of Mercy
Mother of Sorrows
Mother for the Journey
Mother of the Church
Mystical Rose
Our Lady of the Annunciation
Our Lady of Charity
Our Lady of Providence
Our Lady of Ransom
Our Lady of Solitude
Our Lady, Star of the Sea
Queen of All Saints
Queen of Angels
Queen of Apostles
Queen of Confessors
Queen of Families
Queen of Martyrs
Queen of Patriarchs
Queen of Prophets
Queen of Virgins
Queen of the World (in Latin Regina mundi)
Refuge of Sinners
Salus Populi Romani (Salvation of the People of Rome)
Untier of Knots (also, Undoer of Knots)

Theological Mariology 

With the exception of the Jesus Christ, who is believed to have a twofold nature, both human and divine, (dyophysitism), the Blessed Virgin Mary is considered among many Christians to be the unique human being about whom there is a dogma. She is connected to four different dogmas and numerous Marian titles. Christian invocations, titles, and art bear witness to the prominent role she has been accorded in the history and programme of salvation in parts of Christendom, although this is not shared by many (mainly reformed) Christian churches.  

In the Hail Mary prayer, she is addressed as "full of grace" by Archangel Gabriel of the Annunciation speaking in the Name of God. The Nicene Creed, declares that Jesus was "incarnate by the Holy Ghost and of the Virgin Mary, and was made man,". This has given rise to the descriptive, "spouse of the Holy Spirit".

Tradition has it that the Virgin Mother of God was anointed by the Holy Spirit, hence putting her on a par with the anointing of the Kings, Prophets, Judges, and High Priests of Israel, as Jesus Christ is said to have been. 
This in turn opens the way to titles such as: 
 Advocate of the Church (like the judges of Israel) 
 Mediatrix of all graces (like a High Priest of Israel),
 Queen of Angels (like the kings of Israel): the Coronation of the Virgin paintings represent the hierarchy of angels of God while starting to serve Mary forever, after she has accepted to become the Mother of God.
Marian apparitions are said to testify to Mary's gift of prophecy.

In the Roman Catholic and in the Orthodox Churches, the Virgin Mother of God is venerated in a special form expressed in Greek as hyperdulia, that is, secondary only to the adoration reserved for the Triune God. She is venerated and honoured in this way since no other being--whether angelic or human--has greater power than Mary to intercede with God in the distribution of Grace to His children.

Titles associated with devotional images

 The Black Madonna is a statue or painting of Mary, generally of the 12th to 15th centuries, where she often with the infant Jesus, are depicted as having swarthy or black skin.  There are over 450 Black Madonnas in Europe alone. The title given to Mary, usually reflects the location of the image. The Black Madonna of Częstochowa, the Virgin of Candelaria, Our Lady of Ferguson, and Our Lady of Peace and Good Voyage are noted examples.
 Mother of Good Counsel is a title given to the Blessed Virgin Mary, after a painting said to be miraculous, now found in the thirteenth century Augustinian church at Genazzano, near Rome, Italy.
 Mother Thrice Admirable refers to Mary depicted in a painting as Our Lady Refuge of Sinners. Devotion to this invocation of Mary is significant to the Schoenstatt Movement.

Titles of images related to epithets include: 

Titles of images related to places of worship include:

Titles associated with apparitions

Latin America
A number of titles of Mary found in Latin America pertain to cultic images of her represented in iconography identified with a particular already existent title adapted to a particular place. Our Lady of Luján in Argentina refers to a small terracotta image made in Brazil and sent to Argentina in May, 1630. Its appearance seems to have been inspired by Murillo's Immaculates. Our Lady of Copacabana (Bolivia): is a figure related to devotion to Mary under the title "Most Blessed Virgin de la Candelaria, Our Lady of Copacabana". About four feet in height, the statue was made by Francisco Tito Yupanqui around 1583 and is garbed in the colors and dress of an Inca princess.

Titles in the Eastern Orthodox Church

Theotokos means "God-bearer" and is translated as "Mother of God". This title was given to Mary at the Third Ecumenical Council in Ephesus in 431 AD.(cf. Luke 1:43).

Titles of Mary in Islam 

The Qur'an refers to Mary by the following titles:

Ma'suma - "She who never sinned"
Mustafia - "She who is chosen"
Nur - "Light". She has also been called Umm Nur ("Mother of one who was Light"), in reference to 'Isa
Qānitah - the term implies constant submission to Allah, as well as absorption in prayer and invocation.
Rāki’ah - "She who bows down to Allah in worship"
Sa’imah - "She who fasts"
Sājidah - "She who prostrates to Allah in worship"
Siddiqah - "She who accepts as true", "She who has faith", or "She who believes sincerely totally"
Tāhirah - "She who was purified"

See also

Agni Parthene
Ave Maria ... Virgo serena
Catholic Marian art
Catholic Marian church buildings
Catholic Marian music
Intercession of the saints
Litany of the Blessed Virgin Mary
Magnificat
Marian apparitions
Mary of Egypt
Roman Catholic Mariology
Salve Regina
Stabat Mater
Theotokion
Veneration of Mary in Roman Catholicism

Citations

References

External links
Archaeological project to collect all epithets of Mary in Greek, Latin, and Syriac
International Marian Research Institute at the University of Dayton. The Institute, a leading center for research and scholarship on the Blessed Virgin Mary, has a vast presence in cyberspace.
List of 6,000 Catholic titles of Mary
Marian Library at the University of Dayton. The Marian Library is the world’s largest repository of books, periodicals, artwork, and artifacts on Mary, the mother of Jesus Christ.
Eastern Orthodox understanding of saints' titles
 Raised to Heaven because Co-Redemptrix on earth. Thoughts on the foundation of the Catholic dogma . Lecture by Monsignor Brunero Gherardini. Explains the meaning of the Marian titles Assumpta, Mediatrix, Co-Redemptrix. 

 
Titles of Mary
Marian devotions
Marian hymns
Virgin Mary in art